Maturen is a surname. Notable people with the surname include:

David Maturen (born 1948), American politician
Mike Maturen (born 1964), American political activist

See also
Maturin (disambiguation)